Jardell Kanga (born 13 December 2005) is a Swedish professional footballer who plays as a forward for the Bayer Leverkusen U19s.

Club career
Kanga is a youth product of Brommapojkarna. He began his senior career with them in 2021 in the Ettan and became their youngest ever debutant at 15 years old and 3 months, their youngest ever goalscorer, and helped them achieve promotion into the Superettan that season. On 20 January 2022, he joined transferred to Bayer Leverkusen, and was assigned to their U19s. In September 2022, he was named by English newspaper The Guardian as one of the best players born in 2005 worldwide.

International career
Kanga is a youth international for Sweden having played for the Sweden U17s, and is their record goalscorer at that level.

Personal life
Born in Sweden, Kanga is of DR Congolese descent. He is the cousin of the Swedish footballer Josafat Mendes.

References

External links
 
 Svenskfotboll profile

2005 births
Living people
Footballers from Stockholm
Swedish footballers
Sweden international footballers
Swedish people of Democratic Republic of the Congo descent
Association football forwards
IF Brommapojkarna players
Bayer 04 Leverkusen players
Ettan Fotboll players
Swedish expatriate footballers
Swedish expatriate sportspeople in Germany
Expatriate footballers in Germany